Ghulam Muhammad Zaz is an artist from Kashmir, India. He is known for making Santoor and other hand-crafting traditional musical instruments. He is known to be the last Santoor maker of Kashmir.

On 26 January 2023, he was honored with Padma Shri, the fourth highest civilian award in India.

Early life

Zaz was born in 1941, at Zaina Kadal area of Srinagar. He has been making traditional Kashmiri musical instruments like Santoor, Rabab and Sarangi since 1953.

References 

Recipients of the Padma Shri
Recipients of the Padma Shri in arts
Indian artists
Year of birth missing (living people)
Living people
Indian people